Diego Jiménez López (born 11 August 1991) is a Spanish footballer who plays for Recreativo de Huelva as a central defender.

Club career
Born in Benavente, Zamora, Castille and León, Jiménez played youth football with Villarreal CF. He made his senior debut with the C-team, spending two seasons in the Tercera División with the side.

On 28 January 2012, Jiménez made his debut with the reserves in what was his first game as a professional, appearing as a late substitute in a 2–0 away win against Hércules CF in the Segunda División. He continued to be regularly used in the following campaigns, in both the second level and the Segunda División B.

On 1 September 2014, Jiménez signed a two-year deal with Recreativo de Huelva.

References

External links

1991 births
Living people
Spanish footballers
Footballers from Castile and León
Association football defenders
Segunda División players
Segunda División B players
Tercera División players
Villarreal CF C players
Villarreal CF B players
Recreativo de Huelva players
UE Costa Brava players